The 2001 Kärcher Canadian Junior Curling Championships were held February 3-11 at the St. Catharines Golf & Country Club in St. Catharines, Ontario. The winning teams represented Canada at the 2001 World Junior Curling Championships.

Men's

Teams

Standings

Results

Draw 1

Draw 2

Draw 3

Draw 4

Draw 5

Draw 6

Draw 7

Draw 8

Draw 9

Draw 10

Draw 11

Draw 12

Draw 13

Draw 14

Draw 15

Draw 16

Draw 17

Draw 18

Playoffs

Semifinal

Final

Women's

Teams

Standings

Results

Draw 1

Draw 2

Draw 3

Draw 4

Draw 5

Draw 6

Draw 7

Draw 8

Draw 9

Draw 10

Draw 11

Draw 12

Draw 13

Draw 14

Draw 15

Draw 16

Draw 17

Draw 18

Playoffs

Semifinal

Final

Qualification

Ontario
The Teranet Ontario Junior Curling Championships were held at the Forest Curling Club in Forest. The finals were on January 7. 

Carrie Lindner of Bradford defeated Julie Reddick of Oakville 7-6 in the women's final. Lindner defeated Lee Merklinger of the Granite Club of Ottawa West in the semifinal, 7-1.

In the men's final, Bobby Reid of the High Park Club defeated Chris Ciasnocha of the Ottawa Curling Club 5-3. Ciasnocha had defeated Tyler Morgan of Burlington 10-8 in the semifinal.

References

External links
Men's statistics
Women's statistics

Canadian Junior Curling Championships
Curling in Ontario
Sport in St. Catharines
Canadian Junior Curling Championships
Canadian Junior Curling Championships
Canadian Junior Curling Championships